Holger Carl Minton Löwenadler (1 April 1904 – 18 June 1977) was a Swedish film actor.  He starred in Ingmar Bergman's A Ship to India (1947).  He appeared in Divorced (1951), which was written by Bergman. Other appearances include Lacombe Lucien (1974).

Selected filmography

 International Match (1932) - District Judge
 Love and Dynamite (1933) - Axel
 Karl Fredrik regerar (1934) - Striking man (uncredited)
 Simon of Backabo (1934) - Charley
 The Women Around Larsson (1934) - Detective
 Ocean Breakers (1935) - Doctor (uncredited)
 Skärgårdsflirt (1935) - Vasander
 The Boys of Number Fifty Seven (1935) - Hoodlum's leader (uncredited)
 Poor Millionaires (1936) - Hotel guet wearing pyjama
 The Lady Becomes a Maid (1936) - Johan
 En flicka kommer till sta'n (1937) - Anton B. Carlstrand
 Russian Flu (1937) - Socialdemokratisk talare
 Happy Vestköping (1937) - Krohn (uncredited)
 Du gamla du fria! (1938) - Oskar, sergeant (uncredited)
 They Staked Their Lives (1940) - Miller
 Bastard (1940) - County Sheriff
 Blossom Time (1940) - Lundgren
 Gentlemannagangstern (1941) - Inspector Strömberg
 Landstormens lilla argbigga (1941) - Sven Duvberg
 Jacobs stege (1942) - Herman Franzén
 Ride Tonight! (1942) - 'Budkavle går! Rid i natt! I natt!' (voice, uncredited)
 The Heavenly Play (1942) - King Salomo
 I brist på bevis (1943) - Håkan Dahlin
 Stora skrällen (1943) - C.A. Bonk
 Night in Port (1943)- Mårten
 The Word (1943) - Knut
 Kungajakt (1944) - Carl Gustav von Wismar
 Live Dangerously (1944) - Train Engineer
 The Emperor of Portugallia (1944) - Lars Gunnarsson
 Man's Woman (1945) - Påvel
 The Journey Away (1945) - Hjalmar Andersson
 Johansson and Vestman (1946) - Adolf Johansson
 Iris and the Lieutenant (1946) - Baltzar Motander
 A Ship to India (1947) - Kapten Alexander Blom
 On These Shoulders (1948) - Arvid Loväng
 Woman in White (1949) - Dr. Bo Wallgren
 Jack of Hearts (1950) - Krister Bergencreutz
 Divorced (1951) - Tore Holmgren
 Farlig kurva (1952) - Erik Ljung, Christer's father
 The Girl from Backafall (1953) - August Larsson
 Barabbas (1953) - Thief
 Dance in the Smoke (1954) - Stor-Hugge
 En karl i köket (1954) - Arvid Stenmark
 Uncle's (1955) - August Larsson
 Getting Married (1955) - Docent (uncredited)
 Så tuktas kärleken (1955) - Mr. Hallström
 Egen ingång (1956) - Consul Petreus
 Tarps Elin (1956) - Arvid Loväng
 The Biscuit (1956) - Hugo Braxenhielm
 The Halo Is Slipping (1957) - Broberg
 A Guest in His Own House (1957) - Fredik Lannert
 The Minister of Uddarbo (1957) - Alsing
 Sängkammartjuven (1959) - Kurt Månstedt
 The Judge (1960) - Justice Ombudsman
 Tre önskningar (1960) - Frans Lindberg
 Lovely Is the Summer Night (1961) - Melker Gehlin
 Adventures of Nils Holgersson (1962) - Karl XI (voice)
 Heja Roland! (1966) - Waldemar Vassén
 Here Is Your Life (1966) - Kristiansson
 I Am Curious (Yellow) (1967) - King Gustaf Adolf (uncredited)
 Lockfågeln (1971) - Rosencrantz, the evil vicar
  (1972) - Axberg
 Mannen som slutade röka (1972) - Knut-Birger
 Lacombe Lucien (1974) - Albert Horn
 Monismanien 1995 (1975) - Clerk
 Maîtresse (1976) - Gautier
 Paradise Place (1977) - Wilhelm

References

External links

1904 births
1977 deaths
People from Jönköping
Eugene O'Neill Award winners
20th-century Swedish male actors